Hemanga Biswas (14 December 1912 –  22 November 1987) was an Indian singer, composer, author and political activist, known for his literature in Bengali and Assamese, advocacy of peoples music, drawing from genres of folk music, including Bhatiali originally popular among the fishermen of Bengal.

Early life 
Biswas was born in Habiganj, Sylhet, British India (now in Bangladesh) on 14 December 1912 to Harakumar and Sarojini Biswas. He went to the Middle English School in Habiganj. He studied at the George Institution of Dibrugarh from 1925 to 1927 when Nilmoni Phukan was its headmaster.  There he became interested in Assamese culture. He attended Habiganj Government High School in 1930. He also studied in MC College, Sylhet from 1930–1931.  Biswas embraced the values of communism during his college years and wrote poems and plays on equal rights. During this time he started performing "gana sangeet." He did not complete his formal education. Biswas became involved in a movement to ensure the rights of tea garden laborers, farmers, and the underprivileged throughout the region. For his political convictions, he was arrested in 1930.  He was also associated with the Indian People's Theatre Association. He married Ranu Dutta, a high school teacher, in 1959. Their son, Moinak Biswas (professor of Film Studies at Jadavpur University & filmmaker), was born in 1960 and their daughter, Rongili Biswas (a writer & professor of Economics) was born in 1967.

Musical work 

Hemanga Biswas was responsible for a number of popular Bengali songs. A fierce debate once ensued between Salil Choudhury and him on the method of translating the ideal of people's art:

He sang a duet with Bhupen Hazarika, Debabrata Biswas and Pete Seeger. Through his music, he had hoped to motivate the masses to fight for their rights, for them to be united, and for them to be vocal against any form of corruption. His beliefs in equal rights for all led him to repeatedly try to request and urge the then Congress Government headed by Siddhartha Shankar Roy to extend a helping hand to the labour class people. Banchbo Re Banchbo Amra was composed to motivate the laborers to improve their standard of living. His translation of The Internationale into Bengali and his singing of such songs as Amra Karbo Joy, Ajadi Hoyni Tor, and Negro Bhai Amar aided the Bengali leftist movement.

He was influenced by Bhawaiya and Bhatiali, and generated his own style, which combined those folk traditions with Sylhet culture's, which he called Bahirana. He formed Mass Singers (a group for mass songs) in or around 1978.

Movies 
Hemanga Biswas was the playback singer in Meghe Dhaka Tara (The Cloud Capped Star) (1960), Lalon Fakir (Deha Tari Dilam Chhariyo), Utpal Datta's Kallol, and Komal Gandhar.

Partial discography 
 Hemanga Biswaser Gaan
 Shankhachil

Bibliography

Bengali 
 Shankhachiler Gaan
 Hemanga Biswaser Gaan
 Lokasangeet Samiksha
 Bangla O Assam
 Abar Chin Dekhe Elam

Assamese 
 Kul Khurar Sutal
 Akou Sin Sai Ahilu
 Jiwon Xilpi Jyoti Prasad

See also 
 Left Front
 The Internationale

References

External links 
 
 Listen Songs by Hemango Biswas
 Rhyming Revolution: Marxism and Culture in Colonial Bengal
 Translated chapter from Biswas's travelogue: "Abar Chin Dekhe Elam" (Trip To China Again), 1975 
 Hemango Biswas’s popular songs presented at University of Dhaka, in Bangladesh, celebrating his 99th birth anniversary

Bengali singers
Bengali-language singers
Bengali playback singers
University of Calcutta alumni
1912 births
1987 deaths
20th-century Indian male singers
20th-century Indian singers
20th-century Indian writers
Indian folk singers
Indian folk-song collectors
Indian folk musicians
Indian People's Theatre Association people
Communist Party of India politicians from West Bengal
Singers from West Bengal